This article contains a sortable table of many of the major mountains and hills of Switzerland. Therefore it only includes mountains that might generally be regarded as 'independent' and covers most of the country, even lower areas. For a fuller list of mountains, including subsidiary points, see List of mountains of Switzerland above 3000 m and List of mountains of Switzerland above 3600 m. For a list of just the most isolated mountains, see List of most isolated mountains of Switzerland.

Along with the lakes, mountains constitute a major natural feature of Switzerland with most of the cantons having summits exceeding  and three of them having summits exceeding . The two main mountain ranges are the Alps (south and east) and the Jura (north and west), separated by the Swiss Plateau which also includes a large number of hills. Topographically, the three most important summits of Switzerland are those of Monte Rosa (most elevated), the Finsteraarhorn (most prominent) and Piz Bernina (most isolated).

Criteria
The International Climbing and Mountaineering Federation defines a summit in the Alps as independent, if the connecting ridge between it and a higher summit drops at least 30 m (a prominence/drop of 30 m, with the lowest point referred to as the "key col"). There are over 4400 such summits exceeding 2000 m in Switzerland. In order for a peak to qualify as an independent mountain, traditionally a prominence of at least 300 m, or 10 times the aforementioned criterion value, has been used. This is the sole criterion used for this list. Inclusion purely based on prominence is expedient for its objectivity and verifiability. It also allows the incorporation of the lowest elevation (but prominent) hills as well as the highest mountains, maximizing territory coverage and ensuring a reasonably even distribution throughout the country. However, this criterion has its drawbacks. For example, an impressive mountain peak dominating a valley may be connected via high ridges to a barely higher hidden summit. Among the better-known peaks absent from this list are Fletschhorn (due to Lagginhorn), Wetterhorn (Mittelhorn), Mont Blanc de Cheilon (Ruinette), Nadelhorn and Täschhorn (Dom), Piz Badile (Piz Cengalo) and Piz Palü (Piz Zupò). For this reason, additional country-wide lists with somewhat lower prominence cut-offs are also available: 150 m (with elevation cut-off of 3000 m) and 30 m (with elevation cut-off of 3600 m).

This list does not consider nor include topographic isolation. For a list of most-isolated mountains, see List of most-isolated mountains of Switzerland.

Accuracy
All mountain heights and prominences on the list are from the largest-scale maps available.
However, heights sometime conflict on different scales. For example, the Fletschhorn is indicated to be 3993, 3982, and 3984.5 m high on the 1:100'000, 1:50'000 and 1:25'000 Swisstopo map, respectively. The (rounded) elevation given by the largest scale map is always used in this table.
Also, the deepest points in connecting ridges are not always survey points with spot elevations, so that heights have to be estimated from contour lines. For example, maps often provide heights for the place where a route passes over a ridge rather than for the lowest point of that pass.

Finally, many height indications on these maps may be not up-to-date, while glacier and firn melt has decreased the height of both peaks and key cols, quite dramatically. For example, until 2009, the Col des Maisons Blanches which lies on the Corbassière Glacier was measured to be 3,418 m, while the more recent maps (2012) show it to be 3,404 m high. This is the key col for the Combin de Corbassière (3,716 m), which, thanks to the retreat of the glacier, now appears on the list with a prominence of 312 m.

Distribution

The list contains 451 mountains with a prominence higher than 300 m, among which 24 are above 4000 m, 64 above 3500 m, 208 above 3000 m, 321 above 2500 m, 384 above 2000 m, 417 above 1500 m and 443 above 1000 m. The average and median heights are respectively 2812 and 2956 m. Eight summits (sometimes called ultra-prominent peaks) have a prominence exceeding 1500 m, they are found in seven cantons. The great majority of the summits are located in the Alps, the other being located in the Jura Mountains. On average, each summit is the culminating point of an area corresponding to 91.5 km2, which is equivalent in term of density to approximately 1.09 summits per 100 km2.

These 451 major summits are found in 22 different cantons. 3 cantons (Valais, Bern and Graubünden) have summits above 4000 m, 9 cantons have summits above 3000 m, 15 cantons have summits above 2000 m and 21 cantons have summits above 1000 m. Two cantons have more than 100 summits: Graubünden (152) and Valais (104), while eleven cantons have less than 10 summits. 82 of the summits are on cantonal borders, 2 of which being tripoints (Brienzer Rothorn and Säntis). A number of mountains (e.g. Titlis, Chasseral, Lägern) straddle borders as well, but have their summit on one side of the border. In the list, only the exact location of the culminating point of the mountain is considered.

By height

By prominence

Main list

See also
Swiss Alps#Toponymy - for a list of common names used for mountains
List of mountain passes in Switzerland
List of glaciers in Switzerland
List of mountain lakes of Switzerland

Notes

References

Bibliography
Jonathan de Ferranti & Eberhard Jurgalski's map-checked ALPS TO R589m and rough, computer-generated EUROPE TO R150m lists 
Christian Thöni's list of 8875 summits in Switzerland

 
Switzerland